The pileated woodpecker (Dryocopus pileatus) is a large, mostly black woodpecker native to North America. An insectivore, it inhabits deciduous forests in eastern North America, the Great Lakes, the boreal forests of Canada, and parts of the Pacific Coast. It is the largest confirmed extant woodpecker species in North America, with the possible exception of the ivory-billed woodpecker, which the U.S. Fish and Wildlife Service has proposed be reclassified as extinct. It is also the third largest species of woodpecker in the world, after the great slaty woodpecker and the black woodpecker. "Pileated" refers to the bird's prominent red crest, from the Latin  meaning "capped".

Taxonomy
The English naturalist Mark Catesby described and illustrated the pileated woodpecker in his book The Natural History of Carolina, Florida and the Bahama Islands which was published between 1729 and 1732. Catesby used the English name "The larger red-crested Wood-pecker" and the Latin Picus niger maximus capite rubro. When in 1758 the Swedish naturalist Carl Linnaeus updated his Systema Naturae for the tenth edition, he included the pileated woodpecker, coined the binomial name Picus pileatus and cited Catesby's book. The specific epithet pileatus is a Latin word meaning "-capped". The type locality is South Carolina. The pileated woodpecker is now one of six species that the International Ornithological Committee and the Clements taxonomy place in genus Dryocopus. The North American Classification Committee of the American Ornithological Society concurs for the pileated and lineated woodpeckers, the only two of the six that occur in Central and North America. However, BirdLife International's Handbook of the Birds of the World (HBW) places the pileated and several others in genus Hylatomus. Genus Dryocopus was introduced by the German naturalist Friedrich Boie in 1826.

Two subspecies are recognized:
 D. p. abieticola  – northern pileated woodpecker, southern Canada south through the western, north-central and northeastern United States
 D. p. pileatus  – southern pileated woodpecker, the southeastern United States

Description

The northern subspecies is generally slightly larger than the southern. Pileated woodpeckers are mainly black with a red crest, and have a white line down the sides of the throat. Younger specimens tend to have less curved crests, or "mohawks" as some refer to them. They show white on the wings in flight. The flight of these birds is strong and direct, but undulates in the way characteristic of woodpeckers. Adult males have a red line from the bill to the throat; in adult females these are black. Two species found in the Old World, the white-bellied woodpecker (D. javensis) and black woodpeckers (D. martius), are closely related and occupy the same ecological niche in their respective ranges that the pileated occupies in North America. The only North American birds of similar plumage and size were the ivory-billed woodpecker of the southeastern United States and Cuba, and the related imperial woodpecker of Mexico, both of which have been declared probably extinct.

Distribution and habitat
The pileated woodpecker's breeding habitat is forested areas across Canada, the eastern United States, and parts of the Pacific Coast. This bird favors mature forests and heavily wooded parks. They specifically prefer mesic habitats with large, mature hardwood trees, often being found in large tracts of forest. However, they also inhabit smaller woodlots as long as they have a scattering of tall trees. Efforts to restore woodland by removing invasive honeysuckle and buckthorn seem to benefit them, as the removal of brush and shrubbery facilitates their foraging on the ground and in the lower stratum. From 1966 to 2015 the population of pileated woodpecker has, on average, increased by greater than 1.5% per year throughout the northeastern U.S., the Maritimes, the Ohio River Valley, and around the Great Lakes.

Behavior and ecology

Pileated woodpeckers mainly eat insects, especially carpenter ants and wood-boring beetle larvae. They also eat fruits, nuts, and berries, including poison ivy berries. Pileated woodpeckers often chip out large and roughly rectangular holes in trees while searching out insects, especially ant colonies. They also lap up ants by reaching with their long tongues into crevices. They are self-assured on the vertical surfaces of large trees, but can seem awkward while feeding on small branches and vines.  They may also forage on or near the ground, especially around fallen, dead trees, which can contain a variety of insect life. They may forage around the sides of human homes or even cars, and can be observed feeding at suet-type feeders. Although they are less likely feeder visitors than smaller woodpeckers, pileateds may regularly be attracted to them in areas experiencing harsh winter conditions.

Usually, pileated woodpeckers excavate their large nests in the cavities of dead trees. Woodpeckers make such large holes in dead trees that the holes can cause a small tree to break in half. The roost of a pileated woodpecker usually has multiple entrance holes. In April, the hole made by the male attracts a female for mating and raising their young. Once the brood is raised, the birds abandon the hole and do not use it the next year. When abandoned, these holes—made similarly by all woodpeckers—provide good homes in future years for many forest songbirds and a wide variety of other animals. Owls and tree-nesting ducks may largely rely on holes made by pileateds in which to lay their nests. Even mammals such as raccoons may use them. Other woodpeckers and smaller birds such as wrens may be attracted to pileated holes to feed on the insects found in them. Ecologically, the entire woodpecker family is important to the well being of many other bird species. The large cavities made by pileated woodpeckers during their nesting process not only serve as a home for the birds but also play an essential role in the forest ecosystem by contributing to nutrient cycling. Woodpecker cavities can lead to increased soil nutrient levels and microbial activity, providing a nutrient-rich environment for other plants to grow.

A pileated woodpecker pair stays together on its territory all year round and is not migratory. They defend the territory in all seasons, but tolerate floaters during the winter. When clashing with conspecifics, they engage in much chasing, calling, striking with the wings, and jabbing with the bill. Drumming is most common during courtship and to proclaim a territory. Hollow trees are often used to make the most resonant sound possible. The pattern is typically a fairly slow, deep rolling that lasts about three seconds.

Pileated woodpeckers have been observed to move to another site if any eggs have fallen out of the nest—a rare habit in birds. The cavity is unlined except for wood chips. Both parents incubate three to five eggs for 12 to 16 days. The average clutch size is four per nest. The young may take a month to fledge. The oldest known pileated woodpecker was 12 years and 11 months old. Predators at the nest can include American and Pacific martens, weasels, squirrels, rat snakes, and gray foxes. Free-flying adults have fewer predators, but can be taken in some numbers by Cooper's hawks, northern goshawks, red-shouldered hawks, red-tailed hawks, great horned owls, bald eagles, golden eagles and barred owls.

Status
The pileated woodpecker occupies a large range and is quite adaptable. Its ability to survive in many wooded habitat types has allowed the species to survive human habitation of North America much better than the more specialized ivory-billed woodpecker. Pileated woodpeckers have a large population size, and despite being nonmigratory, are protected under the U.S. Migratory Bird Act. While the large birds control many insect populations, especially tree beetles, that may otherwise experience outbreaks, some people may consider them harmful if found on their property due to the considerable damage that pileated woodpeckers can do to trees and homes.

Cultural references
Cartoonist Walter Lantz is believed to have based the appearance of his creation Woody Woodpecker on the pileated woodpecker; while patterning the call on the acorn woodpecker.

Gallery

See also
 Ivory-billed woodpecker
 Black woodpecker
 Great slaty woodpecker
 Imperial woodpecker

References

 Pileated Woodpecker Species Account – Cornell Lab of Ornithology
Dryocopus pileatus- University of Michigan Species Account by Diana Young

External links

Pileated woodpecker stamps at bird-stamps.org
Pileated woodpecker sound at Florida Museum of Natural History
 
 

pileated woodpecker
Birds of North America
Birds of Canada
Birds of the United States
Birds of the Sierra Nevada (United States)
pileated woodpecker
Articles containing video clips
pileated woodpecker
Extant Late Pleistocene first appearances
Taxobox binomials not recognized by IUCN